University Heights is a residential neighbourhood in the northwest quadrant of Calgary, Alberta, Canada. It is bordered by the University of Calgary, McMahon Stadium, the Alberta Children's Hospital and Foothills Hospital. It is a relatively small neighbourhood and is bounded to the north by 24 Avenue NW, to the east by University Drive NW, to the south by 16 Avenue NW (Trans-Canada Highway) and to the west by Shaganappi Trail NW.

University Heights was established in 1963. It is represented in the Calgary City Council by the Ward 1 councillor.

Demographics

Residents in this community had a median household income of $43,079 in 2000, and there were 30.3% low income residents living in the neighbourhood. As of 2000, 28% of the residents were immigrants. A proportion of 64.6% of the buildings were condominiums or apartments, and 66.5% of the housing was used for renting.

Education
There are two schools in this neighbourhood:
Westmount Charter School
University Elementary School.

References

External links

calgarycommunities.com

Neighbourhoods in Calgary